Nygårdsjøen is a village area in the municipality of Gildeskål in Nordland county, Norway.  Nygårdsjøen is located in the northern part of the municipality, close to the border with Bodø Municipality.  The village lies along Norwegian County Road 17 on the east side of the Nordfjorden, just north of the entrance to the Beiar Fjord. Saura Church is located along the fjord on the west side of the village.

The village area of Nygårdsjøen includes several farm areas: Innervik, Skålsvik, Røsnes, Saura, Nygård, and Ertenvåg.  There are about 270 people that live in Nygårdsjøen.

References

Gildeskål
Villages in Nordland
Populated places of Arctic Norway